Kachalak (also Romanized as Kechalak; also known as Kadzhlak, Keshlak, and Kichlek) is a village in Chahar Farizeh Rural District, in the Central District of Bandar-e Anzali County, Gilan Province, Iran. At the 2006 census, its population was 526, in 144 families.

References 

Populated places in Bandar-e Anzali County